Marvin Christopher Dienst (born 24 February 1997) is a German racing driver, who last competed in the Deutsche Tourenwagen Masters for Mercedes-AMG Team Mücke Motorsport. Dienst won the Formula BMW Talent Cup in 2012 and the ADAC Formula 4 championship in 2015.

Career

Karting and early career
Dienst began karting in 2007, collecting his first major karting victory that year in the ADAC Kart Masters. He also won the Stefan-Bellof Pokal in 2009. He remained in karting until 2011. In 2012 he participated in the Formula BMW Talent Cup, a competition for junior drivers. He won the competition, earning sponsorship for 2013 for higher-level single-seater racing series'.

Formula 4 & 3

In 2013, Dienst graduated to single seaters in ADAC Formel Masters, racing for Neuhauser Racing. He achieved eight podiums, including his first victory at the Automotodróm Slovakia Ring. He ended his debut season in fifth. Dienst went on to race for ADAC Berlin-Brandenburg in his second season, winning three races and achieving seven podiums, improving his championship rank to fourth. In 2015, he participated in the inaugural season of the ADAC Formula 4 Championship, which replaced the ADAC Formel Masters. Racing for the HTP Junior Team, Dienst won the championship, thus becoming first champion of the German Formula 4 championship. Dienst also started three races in the 2015 FIA Formula 3 European Championship for Artline Engineering as a guest driver.

Later career

In 2016, Dienst participated in the ADAC GT Masters for Schütz Motorsport. In the penultimate round at the Hockenheimring, he was able to achieve a podium finish for the first time. He scored a total of 51 points, and placed 14th in the drivers' classification and fifth in the junior classification.

In 2017, he drove for the Dempsey-Proton Racing team in the FIA World Endurance Championship, in the LMGTE Am class. In addition, he made a guest appearance for Craft-Bamboo Racing in the GT World Challenge Asia in Shanghai. Here he finished race 1 in 6th place and won race 2 with his teammate Darryl O'Young. This was their first victory with Porsche in the GT3 class.

In 2018 he participated in the European Le Mans Series in the GTE class for Proton Competition.

Dienst again competed in the ADAC GT Masters in 2019 and 2020. He has since gone on to compete in the ADAC GT4 Germany, Nürburgring Endurance Series, Deutsche Tourenwagen Masters and the Intercontinental GT Challenge.

Karting record

Karting career summary

Racing record

Racing career summary

† As Dienst was a guest driver, he was ineligible for championship points.
* Season still in progress.

Complete ADAC Formel Masters results 
(key) (Races in bold indicate pole position) (Races in italics indicate fastest lap)

Complete ADAC Formula 4 Championship results 
(key) (Races in bold indicate pole position) (Races in italics indicate fastest lap)

Complete FIA Formula 3 European Championship results
(key) (Races in bold indicate pole position) (Races in italics indicate fastest lap)

 As Dienst was a guest driver, he was ineligible for points.

Complete ADAC GT Masters results
(key) (Races in bold indicate pole position) (Races in italics indicate fastest lap)

Complete FIA World Endurance Championship results

24 Hours of Le Mans results

Complete Deutsche Tourenwagen Masters results 
(key) (Races in bold indicate pole position) (Races in italics indicate fastest lap)

Complete IMSA SportsCar Championship results
(key) (Races in bold indicate pole position)

References

External links
 
 

1997 births
Living people
German racing drivers
ADAC Formel Masters drivers
ADAC Formula 4 champions
FIA Formula 3 European Championship drivers
People from Worms, Germany
ADAC Formula 4 drivers
ADAC GT Masters drivers
FIA World Endurance Championship drivers
Deutsche Tourenwagen Masters drivers
WeatherTech SportsCar Championship drivers
European Le Mans Series drivers
Neuhauser Racing drivers
Mücke Motorsport drivers
Formula BMW drivers
US Racing drivers
Mercedes-AMG Motorsport drivers
Porsche Motorsports drivers
Nürburgring 24 Hours drivers
24H Series drivers
Toksport WRT drivers
Craft-Bamboo Racing drivers